Chief Alhaji Bai Sherbora Sumanoh Kapen III, commonly known as Chief Sumanoh Kapen, is a Sierra Leonean politician who has been chairman and leader of Sierra Leone's main opposition party, the Sierra Leone People's Party (SLPP), since 2013. Previously he was paramount chief of Mambolo Chiefdom in Kambia District.

He served as Paramount Chief of Mambolo Chiefdom in Kambia District from 1989 to 2007. In 2011, he was elected deputy leader of the SLPP party.

Chief Kapen was elected chairman and leader of the SLPP at the party's 2013 convention held in the southern city of Bo,  defeating his closest rival, former Ambassador to Ghana Alie Bangura, in a close race for the SLPP leadership position.

Chief Kapen is a devout Muslim and a member of the Temne ethnic group from Kambia District in northern Sierra Leone.

References

External links

Sierra Leone People's Party politicians
People from Kambia District
Living people
Year of birth missing (living people)